Rodrigo Armando González Cárdenas (born 12 April 1995) is a Mexican professional footballer who plays as a defender for Liga MX club Atlético San Luis.

Career statistics

Club

Honours
Tepatitlán
Liga de Expansión MX: Guardianes 2021

Mexico U20
CONCACAF U-20 Championship: 2015

Individual
CONCACAF U-20 Championship Best XI: 2015

References

External links
 
 

Living people
1995 births
Mexican footballers
Mexico under-20 international footballers
Association football defenders
Club América footballers
Lobos BUAP footballers
Venados F.C. players
Club Universidad Nacional footballers
Ascenso MX players
Liga de Expansión MX players
Liga MX players
Liga Premier de México players
2015 CONCACAF U-20 Championship players
Footballers from Mexico City